"Oh Yeah (Work)" is the third single from American rapper Lil Scrappy's second album Bred 2 Die Born 2 Live. The song's beat structure incorporates typical southern hip hop snares as well as Lil Jon's signature crunk synths. Although on the release of the album, the single was an unlisted track. It features E-40 and Sean P of the YoungbloodZ.

Music video
The music video for the song was directed by Marcus Raboy and premiered as a New Joint on BET's 106 & Park Live, on February 15, 2007.

J-Bo of the Youngbloodz, Jibbs, Crime Mob, Lil Jon, and Too Short made cameo appearances in the video. It is produced by Lil Jon. Part of the hook is influenced by Lloyd Banks' song "Work Magic".

Charts

References

2007 singles
E-40 songs
Lil Scrappy songs
Song recordings produced by Lil Jon
Music videos directed by Marcus Raboy
2006 songs
G-Unit Records singles
Songs written by Lil Jon
Songs written by E-40
Crunk songs